The BA 2100, or Olympus, is a conceptual inflatable space habitat by Bigelow Aerospace. The larger BA 2100 would extend the volume and capabilities of the B330 module, which is under development as part of the Bigelow Commercial Space Station. As with the B330 module, the number in the name refers to the number of cubic meters of space offered by the module when fully expanded in space (equivalent to 74,000 cubic feet).

The concept model showed the docking ports at both ends. The BA 2100 would require the use of a super heavy-lift launch vehicle and would require an  fairing for launch.  

See also 

 TransHab
 Genesis I
 Genesis II
 Bigelow Expandable Activity Module
 Galaxy (spacecraft)
 Sundancer

References 

Bigelow Aerospace
Proposed space stations